Blepharis is a genus of plant in family Acanthaceae. It contains around 126 species found in seasonally dry to arid habitats from Africa over Arabia to Southeast Asia. In section Acanthodium, there are 13–15 species that use the  carbon fixation pathway. Phylogenetic analysis suggests that this pathway evolved up to three times independently in the genus over the last five million years.

Species (selection)
 Blepharis aequisepala Vollesen
 Blepharis attenuata Napper
 Blepharis boranensis Vollesen
 Blepharis burundiensis Vollesen
 Blepharis ciliaris
 Blepharis crinita Juss.
 Blepharis dhofarensis, 
 Blepharis diplodonta Vollesen
 Blepharis drummondii Vollesen
 Blepharis dunensis Vollesen
 Blepharis duvigneaudii Vollesen
 Blepharis edulis
 Blepharis fenestralis Vollesen
 Blepharis flava Vollesen
 Blepharis gazensis Vollesen
 Blepharis grossa T.Anderson 
 Blepharis gypsophila Thulin & Vollesen
 Blepharis huillensis Vollesen
 Blepharis inflata Vollesen
 Blepharis inopinata Vollesen
 Blepharis itigiensis Vollesen
 Blepharis kenyensis Vollesen
 Blepharis laevifolia Vollesen
 Blepharis linariifolia Pers.
 Blepharis macra (Nees) Vollesen
 Blepharis maderaspatensis (L.) B.Heyne ex Roth
 Blepharis meyeri Vollesen
 Blepharis mitrata C.B.Clarke
 Blepharis montana Vollesen
 Blepharis obermeyerae Vollesen
 Blepharis ogadenensis Vollesen
 Blepharis petalidioides Vollesen
 Blepharis petraea Vollesen
 Blepharis pusilla Vollesen
 Blepharis reekmansii Vollesen
 Blepharis richardsiae Vollesen
 Blepharis scandens Vollesen
 Blepharis sericea Vollesen
 Blepharis sindica
 Blepharis somaliensis Vollesen
 Blepharis spiculifolia Balf.f.
 Blepharis spinescens Vollesen
 Blepharis spinipes Vollesen
 Blepharis subglabra Vollesen
 Blepharis swaziensis Vollesen
 Blepharis tanganyikensis (Napper) Vollesen
 Blepharis tanzaniensis Vollesen
 Blepharis thulinii Vollesen
 Blepharis torrei Vollesen
 Blepharis trifida Vollesen
 Blepharis turkanae Vollesen
 Blepharis uzondoensis Vollesen

References

External links

 
Acanthaceae genera
Flora of Pakistan
Taxonomy articles created by Polbot